Manhar Bhagatram (b. 22 October 1938; d 20-6-2003) was an Indian politician from Chhattisgarh belong to Indian National Congress. He studied Bachelor of Science in Agriculture.

He was member of 5th Lok Sabha by winning by-elections in 1974 at Janjgir Lok Sabha constituency.

He was Member of Rajya Sabha for three terms, 10-4-1978 to 9-4-1984, 10-4-1984 to 9-4-1990 and 3-4-2000 to 31-10-2000 from Madhya Pradesh and 1-11-2000 to 20-6-2003 from Chhattisgarh. He was Treasurer of INC Party in Parliament.

He is survived by Shrimati Kamla Manhar, one daughter and one son.

References

Rajya Sabha members from Madhya Pradesh
1938 births
2003 deaths
Rajya Sabha members from Chhattisgarh
India MPs 1971–1977
Lok Sabha members from Madhya Pradesh
People from Janjgir-Champa district
Indian National Congress politicians